Comet Elst–Pizarro is a body that displays characteristics of both asteroids and comets, and is the prototype of active asteroids. Its orbit keeps it within the asteroid belt, yet it displayed a dust tail like a comet while near perihelion in 1996, 2001, and 2007.
 As a comet it is formally designated 133P/Elst–Pizarro.
 As an asteroid it is designated 7968 Elst–Pizarro.

Elst–Pizarro was reported in 1979 as minor planet , with its image on a photographic plate being completely stellar in appearance. Its orbit remains entirely within the orbits of Mars and Jupiter, with eccentricity 0.165, typical of a minor planet in the asteroid belt. However, the images taken by Eric W. Elst and Guido Pizarro in 1996, when it was near perihelion, clearly show a cometary tail. Since this is not normal behaviour for asteroids, it is suspected that Elst–Pizarro has a different, probably icy, composition.  The cometary nature of Elst–Pizarro was first discovered when a linear dust feature was observed with the ESO 1-metre Schmidt telescope at La Silla Observatory on 7 August 1996.

Subsequently, around the next perihelion in November 2001, the cometary activity appeared again, and persisted for 5 months. It again came to perihelion on 8 February 2013. The outgassing was found to happen only on small part of the surface measuring less than 600m in effective diameter, likely being the relatively recent (younger than 100 million years) impact crater.

As a dual status object, astrometric observations of 7968 Elst–Pizarro should be reported under the minor planet designation.

Exploration

Castalia is a proposed mission concept for a robotic spacecraft to explore Pizarro and make the first in situ measurements of water in the asteroid belt, and thus, help solve the mystery of the origin of Earth's water. The lead is Colin Snodgrass, from The Open University in the UK. Castalia was proposed in 2015 and 2016 to the European Space Agency within the Cosmic Vision programme missions M4 and M5, but it was not selected. The team continues to mature the mission concept and science objectives. Because of the construction time required and orbital dynamics, a launch date of October 2028 was proposed.

Castalia mission scientists are now considering instrument contributions for the Chinese ZhengHe comet exploration mission, which will conduct detailed remote sensing and in-situ measurements at Elst–Pizarro in 2032 following a proposed launch in 2025.

References

External links 
 
 

007968
007968
0133
007968
007968
Discoveries by Eric Walter Elst
Discoveries by Guido Pizarro (astronomer)
Named minor planets
19790724
19960714